Gulella taitensis is a species of very small air-breathing land snail, a terrestrial pulmonate gastropod mollusk in the family Streptaxidae.

This species is endemic to Kenya.  Its natural habitat is subtropical or tropical dry forests. It is threatened by habitat loss.

References

Gulella
Endemic molluscs of Kenya
Taxonomy articles created by Polbot